Minimarg is a village in the Astore District of Gilgit-Baltistan, Pakistan. It is situated on the bank of the Burzil Nala, approximately 36 km south of the Chilam Chowki checkpost. There is a road going north to Astore via the Burzil Pass. The average elevation is 2,844.6 metres above sea level.

History
During the First Kashmir War in 1947–1948, a wing of the combined Gilgit Scouts and renegade 6th Infantry of the Jammu and Kashmir State Forces, called the 'Tiger Force', took control of Minimarg.

Language

People living in the region speak the Shina language.

Climate
July is warm with an average temperature of 19.8 °C. January is cold with an average temperature of -26.3 °C.

Economy 
The dominant source of income is agriculture. Some people travel to other regions of the country to earn. Due to its landscape and climatic conditions the valley provides habitat for a variety of commercially important medicinal plants. A major source of income for people is the sale of natural herbs and potatoes.

References

Populated places in Neelam District